Zarela is a feminine given name. Notable people with the name include:

Zarela Martínez, Mexican-American restaurateur and cookbook author
Zarela Villanueva Monge (born 1952), Costa Rican magistrate

Feminine given names